Birgisson is a surname. Notable people with the surname include:

 Arnthor Birgisson (in Icelandic Arnþór Birgisson) (born 1976) Swedish songwriter and producer born in Reykjavik, Iceland;
Birgir Örn Birgisson  Icelandic basketball coach and a former professional player;
Gunnar Birgisson (1947–2021), Icelandic politician, a former member of Alþingi and the former mayor of Kópavogur;
Jón Þór Birgisson or Jónsi, the guitarist and vocalist for the Icelandic post-rock band Sigur Rós;
Steinar Birgisson (born 1955), Icelandic former handball player who competed in the 1984 Summer Olympics